Editio Critica Maior (ECM) is a critical edition of the Greek New Testament being produced by the Institut für neutestamentliche Textforschung (Eng. "Institute for New Testament Textual Research")—which is famous, for example, for the Novum Testamentum Graece (or Nestle-Aland)—in collaboration with other international institutes.

The ECM is the printed documentation of the expressions of Christian faith communities as they transmitted the New Testament in time through Greek manuscripts, translations, and ancient citations in the first 1,000 years of New Testament transmission. The difference between earlier and later readings is shown by the concept of 'direction' in the ECM, with the earliest expression of the Christian readings printed in the main text. The Coherence Based Genealogical Method (CBGM) is the method being used to construct the ECM. The CBGM has two components, pregenealogical coherence and genealogical coherence. Pregenealogical coherence is a text-critical method which uses computer tools to compare the places of variation New Testament Witnesses to determine if the readings are related. Then, critical principles are applied by a textual scholar to make a decision on the directionality of the reading itself. Places where the direction cannot be determined, or split readings, are indicated by a diamond in the text. The ECM is the first critical edition of the Greek New Testament to include a 1) systematic assessment of witnesses, 2) a mature consideration of those witnesses, 3) a reconstruction of the oldest form of the recoverable text, or initial text, 4) a complete and systematic apparatus, and 5) a full explanation and justification of its methodology and conclusions.  

The Editio Critica Maior project is supported by the Union of German Academies of Sciences and Humanities. It is to be completed by the year 2030.

The beginnings 
Since the founding of the Institut für neutestamentliche Textforschung (INTF) in 1959 by Kurt Aland, manuscripts—some of which had previously been unknown or lost—were traced and photographed, and all known manuscripts were photographed and cataloged. The INTF thus acquired over 90% of the known material on microfilm or photo.

First evaluation 
Initially, in the mid-1980s, a text program was developed. Uniform texts, which, as is well known, constituted the main part in the transmission of the High Middle Ages, were set aside. After the elimination of these texts, the relevant material for the textual history of primarily the first millennium was made available; in addition to the manuscripts of this period, there are numerous later manuscripts that reflect an older textual history. 

The still very high number of relevant manuscripts has gradually been transcribed and subjected to a complete text comparison (Vollkollation). The results are recorded in databases. For the first time, this allows a computer-assisted exploration of all the material. Above all, the acquisition of genealogical data is important, as it illuminates the textual history and especially its beginnings.  The specific problems that exist in the transmission history are now evident.

The digitization 
The institute uses digital methods at all levels of its philological work: handwriting is captured in the highest possible quality as digital photos. These photos are the basis for the transcriptions to be made on the computer. Additionally digitized material from other institutes is taken into consideration. The software Collate is then used to prepare the critical edition.

The result 
In 1997 the first installment of this edition was published by Barbara Aland. The Gospel of Mark, the Catholic Letters and The Acts of the Apostles are available printed and digitally (by using the New Testament Virtual Manuscript Room). In cooperation with the International Greek New Testament Project, the Gospel of John is in preparation. A digital platform — the New Testament Virtual Manuscript Room — has been developed to allow online access to all the data collected during the work on the ECM. This includes the diplomatic transcripts of all the manuscripts used in the ECM, and the databases on which the ECM is based. 

The recent editions of Nestle-Aland (the 28th edition), and the Greek New Testament of the United Bible Societies (the 5th edition), follow the text of the ECM for the Catholic Letters and Acts of the Apostles, and the newest editions of these text-critical editions will follow that of the Gospel of Mark as well.

References

Current editions
The Novum Testamentum Graecum Editio Critica Maior is published by Deutsche Bibelgesellschaft (the German Bible Society).

The Gospel of Mark
Novum Testamentum Graecum Editio Critica Maior, I/2.1, The Gospel of Mark, Part 2.1, Text, 
Novum Testamentum Graecum Editio Critica Maior, I/2.2, The Gospel of Mark, Part 2.2, Supplementary Material, 
Novum Testamentum Graecum Editio Critica Maior, I/2.3, The Gospel of Mark, Part 2.3, Studies, 
The Acts of the Apostles
Novum Testamentum Graecum Editio Critica Maior, III/1.1, The Acts of the Apostels, Part 1.1, Text, Chapter 1-14, 
Novum Testamentum Graecum Editio Critica Maior, III/1.2, The Acts of the Apostels, Part 1.2, Text, Chapter 15-28, 
Novum Testamentum Graecum Editio Critica Maior, III/2, The Acts of the Apostels, Part 2, Supplementary Material, 
Novum Testamentum Graecum Editio Critica Maior, III/3, The Acts of the Apostels, Part 3, Studies, 
Catholic Letters
Novum Testamentum Graecum Editio Critica Maior, IV/1, Catholic Letters, Part 1, Text, 
Novum Testamentum Graecum Editio Critica Maior, IV/2, Catholic Letters, Part 2, Supplementary Material, 
Parallel Pericopes
Novum Testamentum Graecum Editio Critica Maior, Parallel Pericopes,

External links 
 Website about the ECM from The German Bible Society
 View the Editio Critica Maior for the Book of Acts
 Information about the ECM on the website of INTF
 More information about the ECM
 The International Greek New Testament Project

See also 
 Editio Octava Critica Maior

Biblical criticism
Greek New Testament
Textual scholarship
New Testament editions